De motu animalium (Movement of Animals) is a treatise by Aristotle.

Later works using the same title (not including numerous commentaries on the Aristotelian work) are:
 De motu animalium by Giovanni Alfonso Borelli (1608-1679)
 De motu animalium spontaneo by Pierre Petit (1617-1687)

See also
De Motu